The Araneta Coliseum, also currently known by naming rights sponsorship as Smart Araneta Coliseum, is an indoor multi-purpose sports arena that is part of the Araneta City in the Cubao area of Quezon City, Philippines. Nicknamed as "the Big Dome", it is one of the largest indoor arenas in Asia, and it is also one of the largest clear span domes in the world.

The Smart Araneta Coliseum is mostly used for indoor sports such as basketball and volleyball. It is a main venue of the Philippine Basketball Association and for the basketball games of the National Collegiate Athletic Association and the University Athletic Association of the Philippines throughout various game seasons. The Big Dome is also used for other sports and events such as boxing, cockfighting, local and international concerts, circuses, religious gatherings, and beauty pageants.

History

In 1952, J. Amado Araneta, a member of the Araneta family, purchased from Radio Corporation of America (RCA)  of land in Cubao which includes the Araneta family home and is bounded by Epifanio Delos Santos Avenue or EDSA, Aurora Boulevard, P. Tuazon and 15th Avenue.

The Araneta Coliseum was constructed from 1957 to late 1959 and designed and built by Architect Dominador Lacson Lugtu and Engineer Leonardo Onjunco Lugtu. From 1960 to 1963, the Coliseum received international recognition and was recognized as the largest covered coliseum in the world. Today, it remains one of the largest clear span domes in the world with a dome diameter of 108 meters.

The coliseum opened on March 16, 1960, with Gabriel "Flash" Elorde boxing for the World Junior Lightweight crown against Harold Gomes. General admission then was 80 centavos, and the reserve section was five pesos. The coliseum also featured a swimming pool and a gazebo during its opening, located to the current site of the Araneta City Parking Garage South and the Novotel Manila Araneta City. However, the featured facilities closed down a few years later.

Among the notable events to take place at the arena were the 11th and 34th FAMAS Awards, the 1975 "Thrilla in Manila" boxing match between Muhammad Ali and Joe Frazier, in which the arena was renamed into the "Philippine Coliseum", and the annual Binibining Pilipinas beauty pageant. The Philippine Basketball Association (PBA) has played more than a thousand games at the Araneta Coliseum as of today. Other basketball events hosted by the arena were the 1978 FIBA World Championship, a game between the 1978 NBA champions Washington Bullets and a PBA selection in 1979, and the 1982 Asian Youth Basketball Championship where the Philippines defeated China in the final.

In the third quarter of 1998, the Aranetas and Pilipinas Shell (local arm of Royal Dutch Shell) started negotiations for a naming rights deal that would have lasted until 2008. The Aranetas, who wanted to retain their name at the arena rejected the proposed name "Shell Coliseum at the Araneta Center". Instead, the parties agreed on a contract where Shell's name and logo will be painted at the arena's basketball court, a move that was almost shelved due to objections from other PBA teams because Shell owned the then-PBA team, the Shell Turbo Chargers.

In 1999, the coliseum underwent its first major renovation at the cost of ₱200 million. The major changes include the renovation of the lower box area, replacement of seats for the patron and lower box sections, and installation of a four-sided center-hung scoreboard. The section names were also given numerical designations: 100 for Patron section, 200 for Lower Box, 300 for Upper Box A, and 400 for Upper Box B. In 2006, an LED display was added to the scoreboard.

From 2001 to 2008, the highest-grossing event at the arena is the Pacquiao vs. Larios boxing fight between Manny Pacquiao and Óscar Larios, earning 96.2 million Philippine pesos. A concert by Westlife was attended by 17,887 people and earned ₱18.5 million, while a Cliff Richard concert earned ₱17.2 million despite being watched by 5,647 spectators.

Prior to the Ultimate All-Star Weekend in July 2011, it was announced that the Aranetas entered into a naming rights deal with mobile network operator Smart Communications, Inc. (a subsidiary of Philippine Long Distance Telephone Company), renaming the arena into "Smart Araneta Coliseum". The 5-year naming rights deal includes improvements and renovations to the arena such as the installation of curved escalators to improve access in the upper box and general admission areas (the plan was subsequently cancelled due to undisclosed reasons), and the construction of a parking lot that can accommodate up to 2,000 cars. The overall renovation project of the coliseum costed ₱1 billion.

Additional improvements for the renovation of the coliseum were made in 2012, including the renovation of the Red Gate entrance and the Green Gate side facade, landscaped surroundings, and the replacement of Upper Box level seats, thus increasing its seating capacity. The Lower Box and Patron sections were combined to make a new Patron section (100 and 200 level seats). A pathway between the former Patron and Lower Box sections was also made. The former Upper Box A section (300 level seats) was renamed as Box section and the former Upper Box B section (400 level seats) is now referred to as the "Upper Box" section. The renovation project of the coliseum was completed in June 2014.

On January 7, 2015, the Hydra-Rib basketball backboards first used in 1995 were replaced with Spalding ones. The backboards were first used in Game 1 of the 2014–15 PBA Philippine Cup Finals. On June 9, 2017, the OES SHOTS-14G7 shot clocks were replaced. The newer clocks were first used in Game 3 of the 2017 PBA Commissioner's Cup Quarterfinals match between the TNT Katropa and Meralco Bolts.

Events

Sports
The arena is primarily the home arena for the Philippine Basketball Association and the University Athletic Association of the Philippines (UAAP) basketball leagues. It annually hosts every PBA Basketball Championship, NCAA Basketball Championship, as well as the University Athletic Association of the Philippines Basketball and Volleyball championships, UNTV Cup regular season and off-season opening games and championships, and also the Maharlika Pilipinas Basketball League and Premier Volleyball League.

The facility has also hosted the 1975 world heavyweight championship boxing contest, the Thrilla in Manila between Muhammad Ali and Joe Frazier, the 1978 FIBA World Championship, the 2007 Philippines World Pool Championship and the 2017 SEABA Championship.

The coliseum will also be one of the venues for the upcoming 2023 FIBA Basketball World Cup, as well as the tournament's Final Draw on 29 April 2023.

Entertainment and others

The coliseum also hosts concerts, shows, graduations, seminars, ice shows, circuses, and beauty pageants.

During its early years in the 1960s, international acts included Holiday on Ice, Harlem Globetrotters, Nat King Cole, Johnny Mathis, Neil Sedaka, Jo Ann Campbell, Ricky Nelson, Paul Anka, The Ventures, The Everly Brothers, The Dave Clark Five, and more.

To date, the TNT BOYS are the youngest performers to stage a concert in the Coliseum between the ages of 12 and 14 with their Listen: The Big Shot Concert held on November 30, 2018.

Eat Bulaga!, the longest running noontime show of the Philippines, also used the coliseum for some special events such as its TV special Eat... Bulaga!: Moving On on February 18, 1989, and its 10th anniversary on September 23, 1989, in ABS-CBN and Eat...Bulaga!: The Moving held on January 28, 1995, on its new home, GMA Network.

The coliseum has hosted the Binibining Pilipinas pageants annually. From 1990 until 2016, the coliseum hosted Disney on Ice productions during the holiday season; since 2016, the Mall of Asia Arena in Pasay began hosting these productions.  It also serves as a venue for different reality show finales, including Pinoy Big Brother, Pilipinas Got Talent, Philippine Idol, Starstruck, and Artista Academy (which held its one-time grand audition at the coliseum).

At the turn of the new millennium, Regine Velasquez held her iconic two-night sold-out concert entitled R2K: The Concert, in support of her album R2K, on April 7 and 8, 2000. R2K The Concert became the most attended concert at the coliseum with over 37,000 attendees, was center staged and has used the seating capacity to its 360-degree maximum.

Some notable international performers include Air Supply on 2008, Akon (on July 4, 2009), Kelly Clarkson as part of her All I Ever Wanted World Tour on May 1, 2010, Incubus (in 2008 and 2011), Carly Rae Jepsen (in 2013 and 2015), Lady Gaga as part of her The Fame Ball Tour on August 11, 2009, Avril Lavigne as part of her The Best Damn Tour on September 3, 2008, The Black Star Tour on February 16, 2012 and the Avril Lavigne On Tour on February 17, 2014, Kylie Minogue as part of her Aphrodite: Les Folies Tour on July 5, 2011, Bruno Mars as part of his The Doo-Wops and Hooligans Tour on April 8, 2011, The Script (in 2011 and 2013), Snow Patrol (on August 9, 2012), Taylor Swift as part of her Speak Now Tour on February 19, 2011, and Westlife in 2001, 2006, 2011, and 2019. as well as the American Idols LIVE! Tour 2011 (on September 21 and 22, 2011), and the American Idols LIVE! Tour 2012 (on September 21, 2012). Following her performance with the American Idols LIVE! Tour 2012 five months prior, Filipino-American American Idol runner-up Jessica Sanchez had her first sold out solo concert at the coliseum on February 14, 2013. American singer-songwriter Lauv performed at the coliseum as part of his How I'm Feeling tour, on May 20, 2019. Additionally, Lauv also premiered his new single, Sad Forever during his concert.

The coliseum also housed K-pop artists like Super Junior's Super Show-the first Korean to perform in the arena, 2NE1, SS501, CNBLUE, Beast and EXO. K-Pop group U-KISS also had their concert at the big dome and later released into a concert DVD dubbed as U-KISS 1st Kiss Tour in Manila DVD. It was the first time that an international artist released a concert DVD featuring the coliseum. GOT7's first fan meeting in Manila was also held in the Coliseum last November 14, 2015.

On April 14, 2018, Sarah Geronimo held her 15th showbiz anniversary concert called "This Is Me" stylized as "This 15 Me" at the Araneta Coliseum. The sold-out concert was reported as the "Highest Grossing Local Concert of All-time." The concert's official hashtag was also the number one trending topic on Twitter Philippines on the day of the concert with over 200,000 tweets. Netflix acquired the rights to stream the concert film starting in August 2019 making Geronimo the first Southeast Asian artist to have a concert film on the said platform.

The Coliseum was also home to the annual ABS-CBN Christmas special from 2008 to 2013 and from 2015 to 2019, which is typically held during the early weekdays of the second week of December.

Filipina female supergroup DIVAS, which is composed of Kyla, Yeng Constantino, KZ Tandingan and Angeline Quinto staged two concerts at the Araneta, their first concert titled DIVAS Live in Manila, and another one in 2018 with Boyz II Men titled Boyz II Men with DIVAS.

The Coliseum has hosted the A Song of Praise Music Festival (ASOP) Grand Finals Night from 2012 to 2017, and the Wish 107.5 Music Awards (WMA) annually every January since 2016.

However, as the coronavirus pandemic continued to rage across the country, events across the Araneta were postponed/cancelled to prevent further spread of the disease. The venue later resumed hosting events through the 6th Wish 107.5 Music Awards. However, due to the protocols imposed by the Inter-Agency Task Force for the Management of Emerging Infectious Diseases, the event was held without any live audience.

Religious services and other uses

The Big Dome also hosted a praise and worship concerts like Israel Houghton, Parachute Band, Don Moen, Bethel Music, Hillsong Worship, Sonicflood, Planetshakers, Planetboom, Hillsong Young & Free and Hillsong UNITED.
Starting 2017, The Annual Planetshakers Conference is being held at the coliseum.

The Big Dome is also the venue of religious gatherings like the anniversary celebration of Ang Dating Daan (English: The Old Path, the flagship program of the Members Church of God International), Christ's Commission Fellowship, Iglesia ni Cristo, International Convention of Pentecostal Missionary Church of Christ (4th Watch), The Church of Jesus Christ of Latter-day Saints in the Philippines, Jesus Is Lord Church Worldwide, Jesus Miracle Crusade, Kingdom of Jesus Christ: The Name Above Every Name (during early years), Shalom CCFI (Every Holy Week), the Special Assembly of Jehovah's Witnesses and Victory Christian Fellowship.

On October 12, 2014, the main celebration of the 75th Diamond Anniversary of Quezon City was held at the coliseum.

On May 1, 2022, Labor Day, a rally was held at the coliseum organized by supporters of Vice President Leni Robredo and Senator Francis Pangilinan. This was part of their campaign as president and vice president, respectively for the 2022 Philippine presidential election.

COVID-19 vaccination center

The Coliseum was used as a Mega Vaccination Center for the rollout of the Quezon City Vaccination Drive against the COVID-19 pandemic, capable of vaccinating 1,000 to 1,500 people daily. The vaccination center began its operations on May 15, 2021, and it is also one of the largest vaccination sites in the country, following the opening of The Galeón vaccination center, located at the SM Mall of Asia in Pasay City.

Attendance records
On October 1, 1975, when the Thrilla in Manila took place, the Coliseum was filled with more than 50,000 people despite the hot & humid temperatures, and breaching the total design capacity back then of the Coliseum, consisting of over 36,000 people. 
On October 15, 2014, the third game of the UAAP Season 77 Men's Basketball Tournament Finals Series between the FEU Tamaraws and NU Bulldogs set the all-time basketball attendance record of 25,138 which broke the previous record last October 8, 2014, the second game of the series (one week before the third game) attendance of 24,896. For the PBA, On February 12, 2014, the seventh game of the 2013–14 PBA Philippine Cup Semifinals series between Barangay Ginebra San Miguel and San Mig Super Coffee Mixers set the record of 24,883.

Fire incident
On April 20, 2022, during the preliminary round of the 2021 PBA 3x3 2nd conference grand finals, a fire broke out in the arena. This resulted in the postponement of the game between Barangay Ginebra San Miguel and Platinum Karaoke, the last in the preliminary round, and all subsequent games thereafter. Game 6 of the 2021 PBA Governors' Cup Finals, which was scheduled in the arena, was also postponed to April 22, in which it was held at the Mall of Asia Arena. The PBA 3x3 Grand Finals resumed on April 27 in the Ynares Sports Arena.

Gallery

See also

 Araneta City

References

External links

Smart Araneta Coliseum official website
 Araneta Center official website

Domes
Sports venues in Quezon City
Sports venues completed in 1960
Event venues established in 1960
Basketball venues in the Philippines
Indoor arenas in the Philippines
Landmarks in the Philippines
Boxing venues in the Philippines
Buildings and structures in Quezon City
Tourist attractions in Quezon City
Volleyball venues in the Philippines
Smart Communications